James E. "Bo" Butner III (born June 10, 1974 in New Albany, Indiana) is an American drag racer, currently driving a Chevrolet Camaro Pro Stock Car for Elete motor sports in the NHRA Mello Yello Drag Racing Series. The Floyds Knobs, Indiana native made his Pro Stock debut in 2015 at the NHRA Southern Nationals in Commerce, Georgia after previously competing in the Sportsman categories of the NHRA Lucas Oil Drag Racing Series. His first career national event win on the professional level would come two years later on April 23, 2017 at the NHRA SpringNationals in Baytown, Texas, defeating Jeg Coughlin, Jr. in the Pro Stock finals. Butner would win four more national events that year en route to his first world championship in Pro Stock. He also has a world championship from 2006 in Competition Eliminator as well as four NHRA Division 3 championships in the Sportsman categories.

Butner is currently CEO of Jim Butner Auto, Inc. of Clarksville, Indiana, a longtime family owned car dealership which is also the primary sponsor for his Pro Stock Car.

References

Living people
American automobile salespeople
Dragster drivers
People from New Albany, Indiana
Racing drivers from Indiana
1974 births